The 2022 Bulgarian Basketball Cup is the 68th edition of the annual cup tournament in Bulgaria. It is managed by the Bulgarian Basketball Federation and will be held in Botevgrad, Arena Botevgrad.   The competition starts at 24 March 2022, with the quarterfinals and ended with the Final on March 28, 2021.

Qualified teams
The first eight teams qualified after the first stage of the 2021–22 NBL regular season.

Draw
The 2021 Bulgarian Basketball Cup was drawn on 8 March 2022 at approximately 12:00. The seeded teams were paired in the quarterfinals with the non-seeded teams. There were not any restrictions for the draw of the semifinals.

Bracket

Quarterfinals

Semifinals

Finals

References

Bulgarian Basketball Cup
Cup